Pellicani Bocconi Lacrosse is an Italian lacrosse team founded in Milan, Italy in 2009.

History
Lacrosse was introduced to Bocconi University by a few students who had played lacrosse before in England and Hong Kong. In 2011, the team won second place at its first appearance in Coppa Italia. The arrival of American player/coach Scott Offerman helped transform the previously strictly amateur team into a more rigorous athletic organization. A.S.D. Bocconi has a very international roster, with players from 5 countries other than Italy represented, the most in Italian lacrosse.

Season-by-Season

In 2011–2012 Bocconi Lacrosse won the Italian National Championship and we arrived 2nd in Coppa Italia. Its coach won the "Coach of the Year" award and "Best Season Attackman" award.

In 2012-2013, Bocconi Lacrosse won again the Italian National Championship beating Red Hawks Merate 17-3 in the final match. Bocconi Lacrosse completed the perfect season, winning all the matches.
In September 2013 Bocconi Lacrosse won its first Italian National Cup beating Roma Leones 6-5 in the finale.

In 2013-2014, Bocconi Lacrosse ended up first in the League without losing a single game and with goal difference +120. The team has also won the Coppa Italia 2014 in Prato.

In 2014-2015, Bocconi Lacrosse ended up first in the League without losing a single game again. The team has also won the Coppa Italia 2015 in Torino. In April 2015, the team has won their only international title, the Zombies Cup in Belgrade, Serbia, having a perfect score (5-0) and beating the Poznan Hussars in the Finals.

In 2015-2016, Bocconi Lacrosse ended up first in the League without losing a single game for four years straight. In September 2016, the team ended up 7th at the Ken Galluccio Cup, repeating the success of the previous year. In October 2016, the team won its fourth straight Coppa Italia, which was held in Milan, beating Red Hawks Merate in the finals 9-5.

Roster 2016/2017

2016/2017 In and Out

See also 
http://www.unibocconi.it/wps/wcm/connect/Bocconi/SitoPubblico_IT/Albero+di+navigazione/Home/Ateneo/Campus+Life/Attivit_/ASD+Bocconi+Sport+Team/Lacrosse/?lang=it
Pagina Ufficiale dei Pellicani Bocconi Lacrosse
Sito ufficiale della Federazione Italiana Giuoco Lacrosse

References
http://www.lacrosseitalia.it/pages/campionato/2012-13/calendario2012_13.php (Italian Lacrosse Federation)

Lacrosse teams in Europe
Lacrosse in Italy
2009 establishments in Italy
Lacrosse clubs established in 2009